Marininema mesophilum  is a bacterium from the genus of Marininema which has been isolated from sediments from South China Sea.

References

External links
Type strain of Marininema mesophilum at BacDive -  the Bacterial Diversity Metadatabase	

Bacillales
Bacteria described in 2012